Acraea diogenes is a butterfly in the family Nymphalidae. It is found in the Democratic Republic of the Congo (from the south to Haut-Lomani and Lualaba), Angola and north-western and north-eastern Zambia.

Description

A. diogenes Suff . (55 f) is only known in the female, but suggests a thinly scaled form of the preceding species [ Acraea leucopyga ]. Forewing transparent whitish grey, at the apex and distal margin broadly darkened, with discal dots in 1 b and 2 and occasionally also with a median dot, but with no other dots. Hindwing somewhat more fully scaled, above dull grey, beneath with reddish spots; marginal band and black dots almost as in leucopyga. Southern Congo.

Taxonomy
It is a member of the Acraea cepheus species group.  But see also Pierre & Bernaud, 2014.

References

External links

 Die Gross-Schmetterlinge der Erde 13: Die Afrikanischen Tagfalter. Plate XIII 55 f
 Images representing Acraea diogenes at Bold

Butterflies described in 1904
diogenes